Gawłuszowice  is a village in Mielec County, Subcarpathian Voivodeship, in south-eastern Poland. It is the seat of the gmina (administrative district) called Gmina Gawłuszowice.

The village has an approximate population of 700.

References

Villages in Mielec County